Xindi may refer to:
 Xindi (Star Trek), a group of fictional races in the Star Trek universe
 "The Xindi", an episode of Star Trek: Enterprise
 Xindi (instrument), a Chinese flute
 Xindi Township (新地乡), Weichang Manchu and Mongol Autonomous County, Hebei, China